The Battle of Han River was fought between the warlords Liu Bei and Cao Cao in 219 during the prelude to the Three Kingdoms period of Chinese history. The battle was the last major engagement in the Hanzhong Campaign, in which Liu Bei emerged victorious and subsequently declared himself King of Hanzhong.

Background
Cao Cao's general Xiahou Yuan was defeated and killed by Liu Bei at the Battle of Mount Dingjun in 219. In retaliation, Cao Cao led a large army along with millions of grains to supply his troops. Cao Cao wanted to attack Liu Bei's camp at the south of the Han River. Liu Bei sent his generals Zhao Yun and Huang Zhong to defend. Huang Zhong along with his soldiers went to capture the enemy's supplies while Zhao Yun and his subordinate Zhang Zhu would remain in the camp with Zhang Yi unless they did not return.

The battle
Huang Zhong's army moved to capture the supplies of grain Cao Cao had at the North Mountain; Zhao Yun along with his soldiers assisted Huang Zhong during his mission. As Huang Zhong had been gone for long, Zhao Yun became worried that something happened and along with tens light cavalry left the main camp to find Huang Zhong's unit. During their search, they met Cao Cao's main army and were forced to fight against Cao Cao's vanguard, more and more of Cao Cao's soldiers joined the battle. Yet Zhao Yun with a handful of soldiers charged among their masses. At the same time, attacking and retreating, Zhao Yun managed to defeat a far larger army.

Cao Cao's soldiers soon regrouped but again Zhao Yun along with his riders broke the encirclement and could lead his unit back to the main camp. During the battle, the officer Zhang Zhu was wounded and could not retreat. Zhao Yun turned back, rescued the wounded Zhang Zhu and led him back to the camp. Cao Cao's army followed them until they reached the camp. When Zhang Yi saw that Cao Cao's army was in pursuit of Zhao Yun, and was headed towards the main camp he thought they should close the gates and prepare for their assault. However Zhao Yun ordered to have the gates wide open, lowered the flags and quieted the drums.

Seeing this, Cao Cao's army was fearful of some hidden ambush and therefore they withdrew. At this moment, Zhao Yun suddenly ordered to beat the drums with thundering sounds and along with crossbowmen pursuing the retreated army. Cao Cao's soldiers panicked and while fleeing trampled over each other, with many among them drowning into the Han river.

Aftermath
Liu Bei came and inspected the battlefield and exclaimed, "Zhao Yun has valor through and through". He ordered a celebration to late that night honoring Zhao Yun. From then on, Liu Bei's army called Zhao Yun "General of Tiger's Might".

In popular culture
The battle is featured as a playable stage in Koei's video game Dynasty Warriors 5: Xtreme Legends. The player can choose to play as Zhao Yun or Huang Zhong, with both characters following different paths even though they are on the same battleground.

References

Chen Shou. Records of Three Kingdoms.
Luo Guanzhong. Romance of the Three Kingdoms.

219
Han River 219
Military history of Shaanxi
Han River